Michael Mason (born June 28, 1971) is an American former professional soccer player who spent his playing career in Germany.

Club career
Mason was born in Kassel, Germany, but holds a U.S. passport. He began playing at lower division clubs KSV Baunatal and KSV Hessen Kassel before being picked up by Hamburger SV in 1994. He played with the reserve team until 1996, when he made the first of a handful of first team appearances.

In 1997, Mason's career hit its high point. He was playing Bundesliga football at Hamburg which led to U.S. national team Steve Sampson calling him up. That year, he earned five caps. He spent two years at FC St. Pauli, then played briefly with FC Gütersloh, getting picked up by FC Carl Zeiss Jena during the 1999–2000 season.

He last played at a German Regionalliga Süd side, Hessen Kassel, a team he played with as a youth. At his previous team, SV Elversberg, he played for former U.S. national player Brent Goulet who was a longtime player and now coach for the team.

International career
Mason was discovered to be eligible for the United States national team through an e-mail that was sent to manager Steve Sampson. He was called up to several qualifier matches for the 1998 FIFA World Cup.

References

External links
 
 

1971 births
Living people
Sportspeople from Kassel
Citizens of the United States through descent
American soccer players
German people of American descent
Sportspeople of American descent
Association football midfielders
Association football forwards
United States men's international soccer players
Hamburger SV players
FC Carl Zeiss Jena players
FC St. Pauli players
VfR Aalen players
SV Elversberg players
KSV Hessen Kassel players
FC Gütersloh 2000 players
Bundesliga players
2. Bundesliga players
Hamburger SV II players
Footballers from Hesse